Alina Iordache (born 22 March 1982) is a Romanian handballer who plays for SCM Gloria Buzău.

She was given the award of Cetățean de onoare ("Honorary Citizen") of the city of Bucharest in 2016.

International honours 
EHF Champions League:
Winner: 2016 
Bronze Medalist: 2017, 2018

References
 

1982 births
Living people
Sportspeople from Bucharest
Romanian female handball players